The 1893 New Zealand tour rugby to Australia was the second tour by the New Zealand national rugby union team to Australia. Ten matches were played against regional and district sides, but no Test matches were played. It was the first tour arranged by New Zealand Rugby Football Union, which had been founded the previous year. The only previous New Zealand national team was the side that toured New South Wales in 1884. Immediately before departing for Sydney, the tourists played a match against a "Combined XV" in Wellington, which New Zealand won 7–4.

Touring party
Manager: G.F.C. Campbell
Captain: Thomas Ellison

Match summary
Complete list of matches played by New Zealand in Australia:

See also
 List of All Blacks tours and series

References

Tour
New Zealand
New Zealand national rugby union team tours of Australia